Willard Peak is a  mountain summit located on the common border Box Elder County shares with Weber County in Utah, United States.

Description
Willard Peak is situated on the crest of the Wasatch Range which is a subset of the Rocky Mountains, and it is set on land managed by Wasatch-Cache National Forest. The summit is the highest point in Weber County as well as the Northern Wasatch Range. The town of Willard is four miles to the northwest and Ben Lomond Mountain is 1.5 mile to the southeast. The peak is located at the head of Willard Creek and precipitation runoff from the mountain's slopes ultimately drains to Great Salt Lake.

History
This landform's toponym, which refers to Willard Richards (1804–1854), has been officially adopted by the U.S. Board on Geographic Names. The peak was climbed in 1877 by Samuel Escue Tillman and Rogers Birnie of the Hayden Survey and used as a triangulation station. The survey referred to the peak as "Willard's Peak" in an 1879 published report, and "Willard Peak" has appeared in publications since at least 1895. Back then, "Willard's Peak" might have referred to present-day Ben Lomond Mountain.

Gallery

See also
 
 List of mountain peaks of Utah

References

External links
 Willard Peak: weather forecast
 National Geodetic Survey Data Sheet

Mountains of Utah
Mountains of Box Elder County, Utah
Mountains of Weber County, Utah
North American 2000 m summits
Wasatch-Cache National Forest
Wasatch Range